Europa is a station of the Seville Metro on line 1 in the municipality of Dos Hermanas, Seville. It is located in the intersection of Montequinto and Europa avenues, in the neighborhood of Montequinto. Europa is an underground type station situated between Montequinto and Olivar de Quintos on the same line. It was opened on 23 November 2009.

See also
 List of Seville metro stations

References

External links 
  Official site.
 History, construction details and maps.

Seville Metro stations
Railway stations in Spain opened in 2009